The Brazilian Department of Science and Aerospace Technology (DCTA) is the national military research center for aviation and space flight. It is subordinated to the Brazilian Air Force (FAB).

It coordinates all technical and scientific activities related to the aerospace sector in which there are interests by the Ministry of Defense. It was established in 1953. It currently employs several thousand civilian and military personnel.

Institutes
The DCTA has four institutes within its campus.

Aeronautics and Space Institute (IAE)
Aeronautics and Space Institute. It develops projects in the aeronautical, airspace and defense sectors, co-responsible for the execution of the Brazilian Space Mission.

Aeronautics Institute of Technology (ITA)

Aeronautics Institute of Technology is one of the main educational colleges of the Brazilian Air Force.

Institute for Advanced Studies (IEAv)
Institute for Advanced Studies. Responsible for the development of pure and applied sciences: photonics, nuclear energy, applied physics, remote sensor systems and decision support systems. In 2006, the IEAv inaugurated the T3 Hypersonic wind tunnel, the largest in Latin America.

Industrial Promotion and Coordination Institute (IFI)
Industrial Promotion and Coordination Institute. It provides military aeronautical certification and aerospace equipment approval, acting as an interface between the institutes and the industry. Until 2006, it carried out the civil aircraft certification activities, today under the National Civil Aviation Agency responsibilities.

Flight Testing and Research Institute (IPEV) 
Flight Testing and Research Institute. This institute is responsible for the instruction and fulfillment of flight testing campaigns (founded 1953). IPEV has a dedicated Air Force Squadron, based at CTA using the A-29A Super Tucano, C-95BM & CM Bandeirante, and the C-97 Brasília.

Museum
The DCTA is also responsible managing for the Brazilian Aerospace Memorial (Memorial Aerospacial Brasileiro - MAB). It is located in São José dos Campos, São Paulo, Brazil.

See also
 Brazilian Organization for the Development of Aeronautical Certification
 Brazilian Space Agency
 Brazilian space program
 Brazilian National Institute for Space Research 
 Instituto Tecnológico de Aeronáutica 
 Institute of Aeronautics and Space
 List of aerospace flight test centres
 Marcos Pontes, the first Brazilian in space

References

External links 
 CTA homepage
 IAE homepage 
 IFI homepage

Commands of the Brazilian Armed Forces
Research institutes in Brazil
Brazilian Air Force
Organisations based in São José dos Campos
Aerospace